Bribie Island Seaside Museum opened on 14 May 2010 at 1 South Esplanade, Bongaree, on the Pumicestone Passage side of Bribie Island, Moreton Bay Region in Queensland, Australia. It is run by Moreton Bay Regional Council.

The purpose-built museum has a contemporary design, naturally lit interiors, polished hardwood floors, dark ceilings and a facade of timber slats with views to the landscape and beach beyond. A micro-cinema seats around 10 with another 5 standing. The main reception area houses the museum shop. There is a purpose-built ventilated display case to house preserved fish specimens dating from 1904.

The museum opened with three permanent displays, the Matthew Flinders 1799 expedition, the life and art of Ian Fairweather, and the story of Bribie Fish and Fishing featuring the early 1900s fish collection of the  Amateur Fishermen's Association of Queensland Inc. The collection  was started by J Douglas Ogilby, a world-class ichthyologist. At the time of the opening a travelling exhibition on beach culture occupied the touring exhibition space.

The Queensland government contributed $1 million to the construction of the museum through its Q150 Legacy Infrastructure program.

During her visit in August 2010, Queensland Local Government Minister Desley Boyle suggested Bribie Island was arguably the birthplace of Queensland's tourism industry, referring to the steam ship Koopa's regular run to the island carrying 800 passengers. She recounted that during the War Bribie Island was under United States control and was referred to as Fortress Bribie and that artist Ian Fairweather spent many years living in a basic shack on the island.

See also

List of museums in Queensland

References

External links
 Brisbane Australias New World City, Bribie Island Seaside Museum
 Brisbane Living Heritage Network, Bribie Island Seaside Museum
 Opening times and contact details

Museums established in 2010
Local museums in Australia
Museums in Queensland
2010 establishments in Australia
Buildings and structures in Moreton Bay Region